Beat Communication Co., Ltd. is supplying software for enterprise social networking services in Japan. They have Japanese customers such as NTT Data, Canon Marketing Japan Inc., Japanese Consumer's Cooperative Union, All Nippon Airways Trading Co., Ltd. Mitsubishi UFJ Research and Consulting Co.,Ltd., ITX Corporation, ITX, Reitaku University, etc.

In 2013, they acquired the social networking blog site in Japan called “Socialnetworking.jp” that started in 2004. Next year in 2014, ITR, Research Company mentioned in the report that Beat Communication is the leading top company in the field of enterprise social networking industry in Japan followed by Microsoft the second.

The interview with global leaders about “technology and work style” has been picked up on the national media several times. Some of the interviews are Dr. Heizo Takenaka, ex- Minister at Japanese government, Dr. Jiro Kokuryo, chairman of Keio University, Mr. Seiichiro Hino of Microsoft Japan and Mr. Muneyuki Okawa of Salesforce Japan.

History

Ryo Murai wanted to become an inventor from when he was little like Edison according to his interview. He used to be a banker but he started experimental development of software for social graph service at the Incubation Village in Shonan Fujisawa Campus of Keio University in December 2003. He founded Beat Communication Co., Ltd.in Jan. 2004 and released “Beat Communication Package” probably the first enterprise social networking solution in the world ever recorded.

The second software product was called “Beat Style”, it was developed  and released in May 2005.  The unique feature of “Beat Style” was with the function of Q&A community (Enabling Community for Question and Answer to exchange between employees) together with that of social networking.
In January 2007, internal Wikipedia function was added to “Beat Style”.

In June 2007 they developed software for measuring  reduction service called “Eco Style”. At the same time head office of Beat Communication was relocated from Aoyama to Shibuya in Tokyo.

References 

Companies established in 2004
Software companies based in Tokyo
Software companies of Japan